María Teresa Ruiz (born 24 September 1946) is a Chilean astronomer who was the first woman to receive Chile's National Prize for Exact Sciences, the first female recipient of a doctorate in astrophysics at Princeton University, and the first woman president of the Chilean Academy of Sciences. She is known, too, for the discovery of the brown dwarf Kelu-1.

In 2018, she was listed as one of the top 10 most powerful and influential women in Chile owing to her scientific contributions.

During her career she has written two books about astronomy: Desde Chile un cielo estrellado: lecturas para fascinarse con la astronomía (2013) and Hijos de las Estrellas (2017).

Early life and education
Ruiz was born in Santiago de Chile in 1946. In 1966, Ruiz started a program in chemical engineering at the University of Chile but found her vocation in attending an astronomy summer school: she continued her studies in the newly founded astronomy program at the University of Chile and was the first person to graduate the program, in 1971.

Career and research 
In 1975, upon completing her thesis work with Martin Schwarzschild, Ruiz became the first woman to obtain a PhD in astrophysics at Princeton University.

In 1997 she became the first woman in Chile's history to receive the country's National Prize for Exact Sciences. She held a postdoctoral research position at Trieste Observatory and worked for two years at UNAM, the Institute of Astronomy in Mexico.

Astronomic discovery 
In 1997, Ruiz discovered Kelu-1 which is a structure of two brown dwarfs. Kelu is also among the first systems of free floating brown dwarfs. This structure is located in the constellation named Hydra which sits approximately about 61 light years from planet Earth. It was a surprise for Ruiz when she found Kelu, because with all the experience she had, it was easy for her to recognize all the different bodies, although that was not the case this time. The spectrum that she detected was different and it was never seen before. However, she was able to detect lithium in that star and also notice that it was extremely red which is something similar in Brown Dwarfs. These two things helped her to confirm that this structure was a Brown Dwarf and one of the firsts free floating ones.

The name Kelu comes from the language Mapuche and it means “red”, in reference to the color of the star.

Overview of positions 

 Between 1975 and 1976 she worked as a post-doctoral researcher in the Astronomical Observatory of Trieste, Italy.
 From 1977 until 1978, she was a visiting researcher at the Institute of Astronomy of the UNAM (National Autonomous University of Mexico).
 In 1978, she was a visiting researcher at the Goddard Institute for Space Studies (GISS) NASA.
 From 1979 until 1989, she taught in the Department of Astronomy of Universidad de Chile. Here, she started as an associate professor and later on obtained a tenured post.
 Since 1992 she is a member of the Association of Universities for Research in Astronomy (AURA) representing the Universidad de Chile.
 In 1993 Ruiz was a member of the Review Committee of the Instituto de Astronomia in the Universidade de São Paulo, Brazil. (Astronomy Department in the University of São Paulo)
 In 1995 she joined the Comité de Búsqueda para Project Scientist del Proyecto Gemini. (English: Project Scientist Research Party of Project Gemini.)
 In 1996 the Chilean government named her vice president of the Users Committee of the European Southern Observatory.
 Between 2001 and 2005 she was the chairwoman of the Astronomy Department.
 In 2015 she was elected as the president of the Chilean Academy of Science.
 As of 2019, she is Professor at Universidad de Chile Department of Astronomy (DAS), and Director of the Center for Excellence in Astrophysics and Associated Technologies (CATA).

Selected works 

 Desde Chile un cielo estrellado: lecturas para fascinarse con la astronomía (2013)
 Hijos de las estrellas (2017)

Awards and honors
Honors Carnegie-Chile Fellowship, 1971–1975.
Honors MacArthur Foundation-AAAS Starter Grant, 1993.
Presidential Chair in Science, 1996.
Chancellor's Medal, University of Chile, 1996.
National Prize for Exact Sciences, 1997.
Chancellor's Medal, University of Chile, 1998.
Fellow of the Academy of Sciences, 1998.
Labarca Merit Award, 2000.
Scholarship Guggenheim, 2001.
L'Oréal-UNESCO Awards for Women in Science, 2017.
She was recognized as one of the BBC's 100 women of 2017.
Legion of Honour, Chevalier class (Knight)

Personal life 
Ruiz' hobby is embroidery. She is capable of embroidering whole portraits of people and families, such as her own. She started the hobby when she went to study abroad: she wanted to remember her family, so she embroidered a family portrait to bring her loved ones with her.

She is married to the Chilean scientist and professor Fernando Lund. In 1980, they had a son named Camilo who is now a civil engineer.

See also 
 Timeline of women in science

References

External links

1946 births
Living people
People from Santiago
Chilean astronomers
Women astronomers
University of Chile alumni
Princeton University alumni
L'Oréal-UNESCO Awards for Women in Science laureates
21st-century women scientists
BBC 100 Women